Alfred Blaser (17 October 1913 – 23 November 2005) was a Swiss equestrian. He competed in two events at the 1948 Summer Olympics.

References

External links
 

1913 births
2005 deaths
Swiss male equestrians
Olympic equestrians of Switzerland
Equestrians at the 1948 Summer Olympics
Sportspeople from the canton of Bern